Hugo Scherzer (July 10, 1889 – December 24, 1940) was an American composer. His work was part of the music event in the art competition at the 1932 Summer Olympics. He drowned in the Pacific Ocean off Santa Monica, California in 1940.

References

External links
 

1889 births
1940 deaths
American male composers
Olympic competitors in art competitions
People from Świdnica
Accidental deaths in California
Deaths by drowning in California
20th-century American male musicians
German emigrants to the United States